Satnam Singh Mann (Hindi: सतनाम सिंह मान) was a law student who was taken into custody for creating disturbances at Mata Amritanandamayi Ashram at Kollam on 1 August 2012. He died of alleged torture on 4 August 2012 in custody.

At the time of his death, he was a student of Dr. Ram Manohar Lohia National Law University, Lucknow. Mann's relatives stated that they would approach NHRC for justice. He had completed his schooling at Bishop Cotton School, Simla. He has three siblings. For five years prior to his death, he had been undergoing treatment at Bihar Institute of Mental Health at Bhojpur for paranoid schizophrenia.

Death
On 1 August 2012, he attempted to barge onto the podium of Amritanandamayi at her ashram in Kollam. He was unarmed. According to police, he was screaming and reciting words in Arabic. He attacked security guards and then was overpowered by devotees, who handed him over to the police. He was later taken to Government Mental Hospital, Peroorkada as he was showing signs of mental instability.

The superintendent of the mental hospital stated that there were no injuries on Mann's body when he was brought to the hospital. After being admitted to a mental asylum, Mann was attacked and was physically tortured. He died as a result of the injuries sustained in this attack. He was taken to the Medical College Hospital, Thiruvananthapuram, but was declared dead on arrival. During autopsy, 77 injuries were documented on his body. He was only two weeks short of his 24th birthday when he died.

Probe
Kerala Police ordered a Crime Branch probe into the death of Mr. Mann. The special investigation team concluded that the warder and an attendant had attacked Mr. Mann. Four inmates of the mental asylum had joined the two. As per the report, Satnam was beaten with a cable wire and his head was smashed against the wall. Vivekanandan
(jail warder) and Anil Kumar (attendant) were arrested in this regard. In the report to the high court, the SIT revealed that the cause of death was injuries sustained to head and neck. The incident was termed a 'custodial murder'.

Mann's relatives later demanded independent probe in to the matter by CBI. This demand was conveyed to the Chief Minister of Kerala, Mr. Oommen Chandi. The Chairman of National Human Rights Commission, Justice K.G. Balakrishnan opined that the death was suspicious.

A press release by Matha Amritanandamayi Math had also demanded a probe into the alleged attempt to murder Mata Amritanandamayi.

Recent developments

On 3 April 2014 the high Court of Kerala considered the petition submitted by Harmindar Kumar singh, father of Satnam Signh Mann, seeking for CBI probe into the death of his son. During the course of hearing, Public Prosecutor admitted before the court that there were some 'omissions' in the investigation. The High court demanded police to file a statement on this issue. The case will be considered again on 8 April 2014.
Meanwhile, CBI have informed the court that it is not willing to take over investigation of the case.

References

Indian people who died in prison custody
People from Gaya, India
2012 deaths
1988 births